The Flagstaff Hill Football Club (also known as the Flagstaff Hill Falcons) is an Australian rules football club originally formed as Brighton Methodist Football Club based at Mitchell Park in 1963 in the former United Churches Football League.   In 1975, Brighton Methodist FC shifted to Mawson High School Oval and in 1977 was renamed the Brighton Tigers Football Club.  In 1978 Brighton Tigers FC joined the Glenelg South Football Association and the following year was renamed to Flagstaff Hill Football Club.

History
Flagstaff Hill joined the Southern Football League Division 2 competition in 1985 having immediate success with an undefeated premiership and being promoted to Division 1.  Flagstaff Hill remained in Division 1 before getting relegated to Division 2 at the end of 1999.  They returned to the combined Division 1 in 2002.

The Flagstaff Hill Football Club continues to field teams in both Senior and Junior grades in the Southern Football League.

Flagstaff Hill FC has produced a number of Australian Football League (AFL) players including Brownlow Medallist Adam Cooney (Western Bulldogs, Essendon), Danny Meyer (Richmond, Port Adelaide), Ben Marsh (Richmond, Adelaide) and Josh Bruce (Greater Western Sydney, St Kilda).

2016, 2017, 2018, 2019 SFL Champion Club of the Year.

Club song

We're a strong fast team,

We're a high flying team,

It’s the Falcons for me and for you,

It’s the emblem of the team we love,

The team of the Red and the Blue.

Every heart beats true, for the Red and the Blue,

And we sing this song to you,

We'll always soar at Flagstaff Hill,

Keep your eye on the Red and the Blue!

A-Grade Premierships
1974 United Churches Football League Division 2
1985 SFL Division 2 Undefeated 
2016 SFL A-Grade 
2017 SFL A-Grade 
2017 SFL Women's A-Grade 
2018 SFL A-Grade 
2019 SFL A-Grade 
2020 SFL A-Grade Undefeated 
2021 SFL A-Grade Undefeated

References

External links

 Official website

 
 

 
 

Southern Football League (SA) Clubs
Australian rules football clubs in South Australia
1963 establishments in Australia
Australian rules football clubs established in 1963